The 2021 edition of the Cinéfest Sudbury International Film Festival, the 33rd edition in the event's history, was held from September 18 to 26, 2021 in Sudbury, Ontario, Canada.

The 2021 festival was presented under a hybrid model due to the COVID-19 pandemic with both in-person and online screenings. The festival also introduced a number of juried film awards, following several years of only presenting audience choice-based awards; the new awards program includes cash prizes for Outstanding Canadian Feature, Outstanding International Feature, Outstanding Female-Led Feature, Cinema Indigenized Outstanding Talent, French-Language Feature, Inspiring Voices and Perspectives Feature, Outstanding Short, Outstanding Emerging Canadian Short, and Outstanding Animated Short.

Awards

Official selections

Gala Presentations

Special Presentations

Features Canada

Documentaries

World Cinema

Cinema Indigenized

In Full View: Crisis, Conflict, Conscience

Stir Crazy Frights and Fantasies

Festival Favourites

Shorts

References

Cinefest
Cinefest
Cinefest
Culture of Greater Sudbury